The 1993–94 Israeli Hockey League season was the third season of Israel's hockey league. Four teams participated in the league, and HC Haifa won the championship.

Regular season

Awards

External links 
 Season on hockeyarchives.info

Israeli League
Israeli League (ice hockey) seasons
Seasons